John Paul Larkin (March 13, 1942 – December 3, 1999), known professionally as Scatman John, was an American musician. A prolific jazz pianist and vocalist for several decades, he rose to prominence during the 1990s through his fusion of scat singing and dance music. He recorded five albums, which were released between 1986 and 2001.

In the United States and Europe, Larkin is recognized for his 1995 singles "Scatman (Ski-Ba-Bop-Ba-Dop-Bop)" and "Scatman's World". He achieved his greatest success in Japan, where his album Scatman's World (1995) sold over a million copies. Larkin was also a recipient of the American Speech–Language–Hearing Association's Annie Glenn Award for outstanding service to the stuttering community and a posthumous inductee to the National Stuttering Association Hall of Fame.

Early life 
Larkin was born in El Monte, California. He had a severe stutter by the time he learned to speak. This stutter contributed to his emotionally traumatic childhood. At age twelve, he began to learn the piano and was introduced to the art of scat singing two years later through records by Ella Fitzgerald and Louis Armstrong, among others. The piano provided him with a means of artistic expression to compensate for his speech difficulties, and he "hid behind [the] piano because [he] was scared to speak."

Musical career
His first known performance on a studio album was in 1981 on the album Animal Sounds by Sam Phipps. In 1986, he released the self-titled album John Larkin on the Transition label. This album was produced by John himself, along with Marcia Larkin. It featured Joe Farrell on saxophone.

"Scatman John"
To advance his career in 1990, Larkin moved to Berlin, Germany. Once there, he discovered an appreciative jazz culture and started playing jazz gigs. This was when he first decided to take a monumental step away from his insecurities and add singing to his act for the first time, heavily inspired by the standing ovation he received for his rendition of the song "On the Sunny Side of the Street". Soon after, his agent Manfred Zähringer from Iceberg Records (Denmark) thought of combining scat singing with modern dance music and hip hop effects. Larkin was hesitant at first, terrified of being laughed at and criticized once again, but BMG Hamburg was open.

Larkin was worried that listeners would realize he stuttered, and his wife, Judy, suggested that he talk about it directly in his music. Working with dance producers Tony Catania and Ingo Kays, he recorded the first single, "Scatman (Ski-Ba-Bop-Ba-Dop-Bop)". After his first big hit, he adopted the new name and persona of "Scatman" John.

In 1995, at age 53, Larkin became a worldwide star. Sales of his debut single were slow at first, but they gradually reached number one in many countries and sold over six million records worldwide. "Scatman (Ski-Ba-Bop-Ba-Dop-Bop)" charted highly across Europe and Japan and remains his biggest-selling and most well-known song. He later followed up with the song "Scatman's World" entering the UK Singles Chart at number 10, which met lesser but still notable success, selling a million copies and charting highly throughout Europe. In 2019, "Scatman's World" had some resurgence after becoming an internet meme.

Following the success of these two singles, he released his debut album as Scatman John, also titled Scatman's World, which entered the top 10 album charts in many countries, including his then home Germany as well as in Switzerland, Finland and Norway; the album eventually sold millions of copies worldwide, becoming so popular that a Scatman John design appeared on Coca-Cola cans. He began a promotional and concert tour of Europe and Asia. Referring to a performance in Spain, Larkin said, "the kids screamed for five minutes straight, I couldn't start the song".

The second Scatman John album, Everybody Jam!, was released in 1996. While nowhere near as successful on an international level as his debut, the album and accompanying single took off in Japan, the country in which he would see success on a larger scale than anywhere else in the world. In Europe, subsequent singles failed to replicate the chart success of his first two singles, giving him the title two-hit wonder.

The Japanese version of Everybody Jam! included a total of five bonus tracks, including the hit singles "Su Su Su Super Ki Re i" and "Pripri Scat", which were commissioned by Japanese companies for commercials for cosmetics and pudding respectively. The Ultraman franchise even jumped on the Scatman bandwagon, releasing a single titled "Scatultraman", the cover art of which featured the Ultraman characters wearing Scatman's trademark hat and mustache. The album reached No. 45 in Switzerland.

Illness and death
In late 1998, Larkin was diagnosed with lung cancer. In June 1999, Larkin released his fourth and ultimately final album as Scatman John, Take Your Time. Shortly afterwards, he was sent into intensive treatment.

Larkin died at his home in Los Angeles on December 3, 1999, at the age of 57.
He was married to Judy McHugh Larkin, who died in 2023.

Discography

 John Larkin (1986)
 Scatman's World (1995)
 Everybody Jam! (1996)
 Take Your Time (1999)
 Listen to the Scatman (2001; released posthumously)

Biographies 
In 2022, 23 years after his death, a comic biography about Scatman John's life was published, written with the help of John's manager Manfred Zähringer, the producers of his hit singles and albums and other people who knew him during his career.

References

External links

Scatman John Discogs Profile: a short profile and list of singles and albums released by Scatman John or containing his music

1942 births
1999 deaths
American dance musicians
American electronic musicians
American expatriates in Germany
American expatriates in Japan
American house musicians
American jazz musicians
American jazz pianists
Eurodance musicians
Deaths from lung cancer in California
People from El Monte, California
Singers from California
Scat singers
20th-century American singers
RCA Records artists
Jazz musicians from California
American male pianists
20th-century American male singers
American male jazz musicians
20th-century American pianists
People with speech impediment